In electrical engineering, a differential-algebraic system of equations (DAEs) is a system of equations that either contains differential equations and algebraic equations, or is equivalent to such a system.
In mathematics these are examples of differential algebraic varieties and correspond to ideals in differential polynomial rings (see the article on differential algebra for the algebraic setup. 

We can write these differential equations for a dependent vector of variables x in one independent variable t, as

They are distinct from ordinary differential equation (ODE) in that a DAE is not completely solvable for the derivatives of all components of the function x because these may not all appear (i.e. some equations are algebraic); technically the distinction between an implicit ODE system [that may be rendered explicit] and a DAE system is that the Jacobian matrix  is a singular matrix for a DAE system. This distinction between ODEs and DAEs is made because DAEs have different characteristics and are generally more difficult to solve.

In practical terms, the distinction between DAEs and ODEs is often that the solution of a DAE system depends on the derivatives of the input signal and not just the signal itself as in the case of ODEs; this issue is commonly encountered in nonlinear systems with hysteresis, such as the Schmitt trigger.

This difference is more clearly visible if the system may be rewritten so that instead of x we consider a pair  of vectors of dependent variables and the DAE has the form

A DAE system of this form is called semi-explicit. Every solution of the second half g of the equation defines a unique direction for x via the first half f of the equations, while the direction for y is arbitrary. But not every point (x,y,t) is a solution of g. The variables in x and the first half f of the equations get the attribute differential. The components of y and the second half g of the equations are called the algebraic variables or equations of the system. [The term algebraic in the context of DAEs only means free of derivatives and is not related to (abstract) algebra.]

The solution of a DAE consists of two parts, first the search for consistent initial values and second the computation of a trajectory. To find consistent initial values it is often necessary to consider the derivatives of some of the component functions of the DAE. The highest order of a derivative that is necessary for this process is called the differentiation index. The equations derived in computing the index and consistent initial values may also be of use in the computation of the trajectory. A semi-explicit DAE system can be converted to an implicit one by decreasing the differentiation index by one, and vice versa.

Other forms of DAEs 
The distinction of DAEs to ODEs becomes apparent if some of the dependent variables occur without their derivatives. The vector of dependent variables may then be written as pair  and the system of differential equations of the DAE appears in the form

where
 , a scalar (usually time) is an independent variable.
  is a vector of  functions that involve subsets of these  variables and  derivatives.

As a whole, the set of DAEs is a function

Initial conditions must be a solution of the system of equations of the form

Examples 
The behaviour of a pendulum of length L with center in (0,0) in Cartesian coordinates (x,y) is described by the Euler–Lagrange equations

where  is a Lagrange multiplier. The momentum variables u and v should be constrained by the law of conservation of energy and their direction should point along the circle. Neither condition is explicit in those equations. Differentiation of the last equation leads to

restricting the direction of motion to the tangent of the circle. The next derivative of this equation implies

To obtain unique derivative values for all dependent variables the last equation was three times differentiated. This gives a differentiation index of 3, which is typical for constrained mechanical systems.

To proceed to the next point it is sufficient to get the derivatives of x and u, that is, the system to solve is now

 
This is a semi-explicit DAE of index 1.

DAEs also naturally occur in the modelling of circuits with non-linear devices. Modified nodal analysis employing DAEs is used for example in the ubiquitous SPICE family of numeric circuit simulators. Similarly, Fraunhofer's Analog Insydes Mathematica package can be used to derive DAEs from a netlist and then simplify or even solve the equations symbolically in some cases. It is worth noting that the index of a DAE (of a circuit) can be made arbitrarily high by cascading/coupling via capacitors operational amplifiers with positive feedback.

Semi-explicit DAE of index 1 
DAE of the form

are called semi-explicit. The index-1 property requires that g is solvable for y. In other words, the differentiation index is 1 if by differentiation of the algebraic equations for t an implicit ODE system results,

which is solvable for  if 

Every sufficiently smooth DAE is almost everywhere reducible to this semi-explicit index-1 form.

Numerical treatment of DAE and applications 

Two major problems in solving DAEs are index reduction and consistent initial conditions. Most numerical solvers require ordinary differential equations and algebraic equations of the form

It is a non-trivial task to convert arbitrary DAE systems into ODEs for solution by pure ODE solvers. Techniques which can be employed include Pantelides algorithm and dummy derivative index reduction method. Alternatively, a direct solution of high-index DAEs with inconsistent initial conditions is also possible. This solution approach involves a transformation of the derivative elements through orthogonal collocation on finite elements or direct transcription into algebraic expressions. This allows DAEs of any index to be solved without rearrangement in the open equation form

Once the model has been converted to algebraic equation form, it is solvable by large-scale nonlinear programming solvers (see APMonitor).

Tractability 

Several measures of DAEs tractability in terms of numerical methods have developed, such as differentiation index, perturbation index, tractability index, geometric index, and the Kronecker index.

Structural analysis for DAEs 
We use the -method to analyze a DAE. We construct for the DAE a signature matrix , where each row corresponds to each equation  and each column corresponds to each variable .

The corresponding signature matrix is

See also 
 Algebraic differential equation, a different concept despite the similar name
 Delay differential equation
 Partial differential algebraic equation
 Modelica Language

References

Further reading

Books 
 
 
 
  (Covers the structural approach to computing the DAE index.)

Various papers

External links 
 http://www.scholarpedia.org/article/Differential-algebraic_equations

Differential equations
Numerical analysis
Differential calculus